Brooke Serene Butler is an American actress.

Early life
Butler was born in Woodinville, Washington. She has been performing on stage and screen since childhood. She has a bachelor's degree at the USC School of Dramatic Arts.

Career
Butler was cast as zombie cheerleader Tracy Bingham in the 2013 American comedy/horror film, All Cheerleaders Die which premiered at the Toronto International Film Festival.  In 2015, Butler played the starring role Kaylee in feature film The Sand. Butler also played starring role of Isabel Fletcher in feature film Online Abduction. Butler played the young Darlene Snell in a 2018 episode of the Netflix series Ozark. In 2018, Butler played the role of Julie Guilford in an episode of the TV series The Resident.

In 2012, Butler was featured on the cover of Swoop magazine. In 2015, Butler was named to Maxim magazine's "Hot 10" Actresses to Watch.

Filmography

Film

Television

References

External links 
 
 

Living people
American television actresses
American film actresses
People from Woodinville, Washington
USC School of Dramatic Arts alumni
21st-century American actresses
Year of birth missing (living people)